Nisus or Nisos may refer to:

Classical mythology
 Nisus of Nisus and Euryalus, son of Hyrtacus, friend of Euryalus, in Virgil's Aeneid
 Nisos, a king of Megara
 Nisus or Silenus, foster father of Dionysus
 Nisus of Dulichium, son of Aretias, father of Amphinomus, in Book 18 of Homer's Odyssey

Other uses
 HMS Nisus (1810), a Royal Navy 38-gun fifth rate frigate
 French brig Nisus (1805), a Palinure-class brig of the French Navy
 Nisus Writer, a word processor for the Apple Macintosh
 Eurasian sparrowhawk, Accipiter nisus, a small bird of prey in the family Accipitridae